David Bernard Wood OBE (born 21 February 1944) is an English actor, author, composer, director, magician and producer. The Times called him "the National Children's Dramatist". In 1979, he joined Bernard Cribbins, Maurice Denham, and Jan Francis in a reading of  The Hobbit for the BBC Television show Jackanory.

 Early life 
Wood was born on 21 February 1944 in Sutton, Surrey. He was educated at Chichester High School for Boys and Worcester College, Oxford.

 Stage work 
Along with John Gould, he founded the Whirligig Theatre, a touring children's theatre company.

His most famous story, The Gingerbread Man (1976), has been all across the world since its premiere at the Towngate Theatre in Basildon. Wood, FilmFair, and Central adapted the musical into an animated children's television series. The adaptation, also called The Gingerbread Man, aired on ITV in 1992.

He was appointed Officer of the Order of the British Empire (OBE) in the 2004 Queen's Birthday Honours List, for his services to literature and drama.

From 1966-70, he was married to actress Sheila Ruskin.

 Film career 
Among his film roles are Johnny in Lindsay Anderson's If.... (1968) and  Thompson in Aces High (1976). He appeared as the character Bingo Little in the original London cast of the Andrew Lloyd Webber and Alan Ayckbourn musical Jeeves in 1975.

He wrote the screenplay for the 1974 adaptation of Arthur Ransome's Swallows and Amazons, released by Anglo EMI.

Plays(incomplete list)Original works:

 The Plotters Of Cabbage Patch Corner (1970)
 Flibberty and the Penguin (1971)
 The Papertown Paperchase (1972)
 Hijack Over Hygenia (1973)
 The Gingerbread Man (1976), a musical inspired by the 19th-century fairy tale "The Gingerbread Man"
 Nutcracker Sweet (1977)The Ideal Gnome Expedition (1980)
 The Selfish Shellfish (1983)
 The See-Saw Tree (1986)
Adaptations of Roald Dahl's books for children:

 The BFG (1991), adapted from The BFG (1982)
 The Witches (1992), adapted from The Witches (1983)
 The Twits (1999), adapted from The Twits (1979)
 Fantastic Mr Fox (2001), adapted from Fantastic Mr Fox (1970)
 James And The Giant Peach (2001), adapted from James And The Giant Peach (1961)
 Danny The Champion Of The World (2004), adapted from Danny the Champion of the World (1975)
 George's Marvellous Medicine (2009), adapted from George's Marvellous Medicine (1981)
 The Magic Finger (2013), adapted from The Magic Finger (1962)
Other adaptations of English authors of children's literature:

 The Owl and the Pussycat went to See.... (1968) co-written with Sheila Ruskin, based on the nonsense poetry of Edward Lear 
 Meg and Mog (1981), adapted from Helen Nicoll's books about her characters Meg and Mog
 Noddy (1993), adapted from Enid Blyton's books about her character Noddy
 Rupert Bear (1993), adapted from Mary Tourtel's comic strip Rupert Bear (1920)
 Babe, the Sheep-Pig (1997), adapted from Dick King-Smith's The Sheep-Pig (1983)
 Spot's Birthday Party (2000), adapted from the Spot books by Eric Hill (1980)
 Tom's Midnight Garden (2000). adapted from Tom's Midnight Garden by Philippa Pearce (1958)
 The Tiger Who Came To Tea (2008), adapted from Judith Kerr's The Tiger Who Came To Tea (1968)
 Guess How Much I Love You (2010), adapted from  Sam McBratney's Guess How Much I Love You (1994)
 Goodnight Mister Tom (2011), adapted from Michelle Magorian's Goodnight Mister Tom (1981)

Adaptations of adult literature:

 The Go-Between (2011; West End 2016), adapted from L.P. Hartley's The Go-Between (1953)

Filmography

Notes

References
Biography from his official website

Further reading
 David Wood with Janet Grant (1997), Theatre for Children: A Guide to Writing, Adapting, Directing, and Acting. London : Faber and Faber.  -- The introduction (pages xiv to xxiv) includes an overview of Wood's early career.
 David Wood (1999/2014), Plays 1. London: Methuen 
 David Wood (1999/2014), Plays 2. London: Methuen 
 David Wood (2018), Filming If...''. Book Guild Publishing.

External links
 

1944 births
Living people
20th-century English male actors
21st-century English male actors
Alumni of Worcester College, Oxford
English children's writers
English dramatists and playwrights
English male dramatists and playwrights
English male film actors
English male television actors
Male actors from London
Officers of the Order of the British Empire
People from the London Borough of Sutton